Joseph Wiseham was the Chief Justice of the Gambia from 1957 to 1968. He was succeeded by Phillip Bridges in 1968.

References 

Chief justices of the Gambia
Year of birth missing
Place of birth missing
Possibly living people